Tomáš Janečko (born 24 December 1986) is a Czech former figure skater. He is the 2005 Czech national champion and 2007 Czech national bronze medalist. He reached the free skate at the 2003 World Junior Championships.

Programs

Competitive highlights

References

External links

 

Czech male single skaters
1986 births
Living people
Sportspeople from Karviná